State Route 143 (SR 143) is a 12.46 mile state highway that goes through the Cherokee National Forest and Roan Mountain State Park in northeastern Tennessee. The road is very curvy as it does go through a mountainous area. Its northern terminus is U.S. Route 19E (US 19E) in the town of Roan Mountain and its southern terminus is North Carolina Highway 261 (NC 261).

Route description
SR 143 begins at the top of Roan Mountain on the North Carolina border, where it continues south as North Carolina Highway 261. It goes north through some switchback curves and mountainous terrain before straightening out and leaving the mountains to pass through some farmland and Roan Mountain State Park. SR 143 then enters the town of Roan Mountain and intersects with its former alignment through town before bypassing downtown to the west before coming to an end at an intersection with US 19E/SR 37.

Junction list

References

143
Transportation in Carter County, Tennessee
Roan Mountain, Tennessee